The second cabinet of Alexandru Vaida-Voevod was the government of Romania from 6 June to 10 August 1932.

Ministers
The ministers of the cabinet were as follows:

President of the Council of Ministers:
Alexandru Vaida-Voevod (6 June - 10 August 1932)
Minister of the Interior: 
Alexandru Vaida-Voevod (6 June - 10 August 1932)
Minister of Foreign Affairs: 
(interim) Alexandru Vaida-Voevod (6 June - 10 August 1932)
Minister of Finance:
Gheorghe Mironescu (6 June - 10 August 1932)
Minister of Justice:
Virgil Potârcă (6 June - 10 August 1932)
Minister of Public Instruction, Religious Affairs, and the Arts:
(interim) Ion Lugoșianu (6 - 9 June 1932)
Dimitrie Gusti (9 June - 10 August 1932)
Minister of National Defence:
Gen. Constantin Ștefănescu-Amza (6 June - 10 August 1932)
Minister of Agriculture and Property:
(interim) Virgil Potârcă (6 - 7 June 1932)
Voicu Nițescu (7 June - 10 August 1932)
Minister of Industry and Commerce:
Ion Lugoșianu (6 June - 10 August 1932)
Minister of Labour, Health, and Social Security:
(interim) Alexandru Vaida-Voievod (7 - 9 June 1932)
D. R. Ioanițescu (9 June - 10 August 1932)
Minister of Public Works and Communications:
(interim) Gheorghe Mironescu (6 - 7 June 1932)
Ioan Gr. Periețeanu (7 June - 10 August 1932)

Ministers of State:
Emil Hațieganu (6 June - 10 August 1932)
Pantelimon Halippa (6 June - 10 August 1932)

References

Cabinets of Romania
Cabinets established in 1932
Cabinets disestablished in 1932
1932 establishments in Romania
1932 disestablishments in Romania